8 November is a station on the third (purple) line of the Baku Metro. The station was named to commemorate Victory Day of Azerbaijan.

History 
Preparations for the construction of B-3 and B-4 stations started back in 2012, when the traffic on Ceyhun Selimov Street and Jalil Mammadguluzade Street for each station, respectively, was blocked. Over the next 4 years, tunnels were laid from Memar Ajami-2 station. After the opening of the first two stations of the purple line, the Baku Metro announced that the third station would open in 2018.

The station was planned to be opened in 2018, but the work was not completed and the opening was postponed to 2019. The deputy chairman of CJSC Baku Metro stated that there was a delay due to natural and geological problems. A new station opening date of 2020 was announced, but the works were also not completed on time.

On 8 December, by order of Azerbaijani President Ilham Aliyev, the station was named "8 November", in honour of the victory in the Second Karabakh War. The Cabinet of Ministers' decision states:

The official opening took place on 29 May 2021, when the station was visited by President Ilham Aliyev of Azerbaijan.

See also 
 List of Baku metro stations
 Elmler Akademiyasi (Baku Metro)
 Hezi Aslanov (Baku Metro)

References 

Baku Metro stations
Aftermath of the 2020 Nagorno-Karabakh war
Railway stations in Azerbaijan opened in 2021